Xylomya parens is a species of fly in the family Xylomyidae.

Distribution
Canada, United States.

References

Xylomyidae
Insects described in 1885
Taxa named by Samuel Wendell Williston
Diptera of North America